Ben Haith (born 1942), also known as Boston Ben, is an American activist from Boston, Massachusetts. Haith has been active in anti-crime groups since the 1980s. He is recognized as the founder of the National Juneteenth Celebration Foundation. Haith is also known for creating and copyrighting the Juneteenth flag.

Career

Activism
Haith is a grass roots community activist who publicly identifies and critiques racial disparity. He is active in anti-crime activities and he has been critical of law enforcement. Throughout his life he has advocated for investigations of the police. 

In 1983, when he was 40 years old, he ran for public office for the first time. Haith ran for the District 7 city council seat, which represented a predominantly African American section of Boston. He described himself as a community activist who also owned an advertising agency with his wife. He ran his campaign out of a tent near Dudley Station Historic District. In 1986, he advocated for black areas of Boston to secede from the city.

In 2008 Haith and others camped out in the empty apartments located in the Lenox Street projects and Orchard Park in Roxbury. The goal of the action was to end "Stop Snitching culture by getting neighbors to "drop a dime" when they saw illegal activity.

Anti-LGBT activism
In April 1985 he also spoke out against a gay couple (two males) who became a foster home for two young boys in Boston. Haith wanted publicity for his run for City Council, so he contacted the editors at the Boston Globe and complained that two young boys were placed with a male couple in his neighborhood. The article had been written by the Boston Globe reporter Ken Cooper. Haith told Cooper that he was "completely opposed...and it was a breakdown of the society and its values and morals." The Associated Press picked up the story, and ultimately, the gay couple lost custody of the children. The publicity led Massachusetts governor Michael Dukakis to order the boys removed from the home the next day. 

The next month, seven of the nine members of Roxbury Highlands Neighborhood Association Inc., penned an op-ed which was published in the Boston Globe. In the editorial, the members stated that Haith had misrepresented the opinions of his neighbors. They also accused the Globe and reporter Ken Cooper of "...creating the controversy it purports to report".

Juneteenth
Haith founded the National Juneteenth Celebration Foundation, and he led the holiday's first Juneteenth flag-raising ceremony in Boston's Roxbury Heritage State Park in 2000. Haith designed the Juneteenth flag in 1997, and in 2000 (after the addition of the text June 19, 1865), he copyrighted the design.

References

External links
Video News -  Bias in covering Roxbury crime (Ben Haith)

1942 births
Living people
Activists from Boston
Flag designers
African-American activists
Discrimination against LGBT people in the United States
Juneteenth
American community activists